Harry Greenspun is a physician-executive and co-author of the book, “Reengineering Healthcare: A Manifesto for Radically Rethinking Health Care Delivery” with Jim Champy Currently he serves as the Chief Medical Officer of Guidehouse LLP.

He serves on the World Economic Forum’s Global Health Advisory Board, was chairman of the HIMSS Government Relations Roundtable, and is a co-chair of the HIMSS task force that created the white paper, “Enabling Healthcare Reform Using Information Technology”. He has also made recommendations to the Obama administration and Congress on the importance of health IT investment.

Before joining Guidehouse, Greenspun served as Chief Medical Officer for Northrop Grumman Corporation and for Dell, and provided subject matter expertise, thought leadership, and strategic direction for the company.  He is an educator and consultant, sharing his expertise and experience for many organizations including the Advisory Board Company.  He also sits on boards for Tufts University, George Mason University, and BNA.

In 2010, Modern Healthcare magazine named Greenspun one of the "50 Most Powerful Physician Executives in Healthcare."

Greenspun received his bachelor's degree from Harvard University and his medical degree from the University of Maryland School of Medicine. He completed his residency and fellowship at Johns Hopkins Hospital, where he served as chief resident in the Department of Anesthesiology and Critical Care Medicine.

References

American anesthesiologists
Harvard University alumni
Tufts University
Living people
Dell people
Year of birth missing (living people)
University of Maryland School of Medicine alumni